66 Cancri is a binary star system near the northern border of the zodiac constellation of Cancer, located 474 light years away from the Sun. It is visible to the naked eye as a faint, white-hued star with a combined apparent visual magnitude of 5.87. The pair are moving closer to the Earth with a heliocentric radial velocity of −13 light years. As of 2003, the magnitude 8.56 companion was located at an angular separation of  along a position angle of 134° from the primary.

The brighter member of the system, designated component A, is an A-type main-sequence star with a stellar classification of A2 V. It is around 162 million years old with a high rate of spin, showing a projected rotational velocity of 183 km/s. Estimates of the mass of the star range from 1.7 up to 2.73 times the mass of the Sun. It is radiating 96 times the Sun's luminosity from its photosphere at an effective temperature of 8,974 K.

References

A-type main-sequence stars
Binary stars
Cancer (constellation)
Durchmusterung objects
Cancri, 66
077104
044307
3587